Araeopaschia is a genus of snout moths. It was described by George Hampson in 1906.

Species
 Araeopaschia demotis (Meyrick, 1887)
 Araeopaschia normalis (Hampson, 1906)
 Araeopaschia rufescentalis Hampson, 1906

References

Epipaschiinae
Pyralidae genera